The 2022 Halton Borough Council election took place on 5 May 2022, alongside other local elections in the United Kingdom, to elect a third of the council's 54 seats. The Labour Party won most of the 18 seats up for election, comfortably retaining their overall majority. Only one seat switched hands: Daresbury, Moore and Sandymoor elected a Conservative, a loss for the Green Party who were left without any members on the council.

Results summary

Ward results
An asterisk (*) next to a candidate's name indicates that they were an incumbent councillor.

Appleton

Bankfield

Beechwood and Heath

Birchfield

Bridgewater

Central and West Bank

Daresbury, Moore and Sandymoor

The election was a dead heat between the Conservative and Labour candidates, with both getting 398 votes. The election was decided by the drawing of names from an envelope, with the Conservative candidate winning.

Ditton, Hale Village and Halebank

Farnworth

Grange

Halton Castle

Halton Lea

Halton View

Highfield

Hough Green

Mersey and Weston

Norton North

Norton South and Preston Brook

References

Halton
May 2022 events in the United Kingdom
2022
2020s in Cheshire